Omega Upsilon Phi was a medical fraternity founded at the University at Buffalo on .  Its Founders were:

The crest was a shield displaying a monogram of the Omega Upsilon Phi letters below an eye. 

The colors are crimson and gold and the flower is the red carnation. 

Omega Upsilon Phi had four degrees in its ritualistic work, three secret undergraduate degrees and one open honorary degree known as the Hippocratic Degree conferred by Grand Chapter vote.

The fraternity went defunct in 1934 after merging with Phi Beta Pi Medical Fraternity.

Chapters
Omega Upsilon Phi chapters:

See also 

 Professional fraternities and sororities

References

Professional medical fraternities and sororities in the United States
Fraternities and sororities in Canada
Defunct fraternities and sororities
1894 establishments in New York (state)
Student organizations established in 1894
Phi Beta Pi
Former members of Professional Fraternity Association